

Engineering 
Engineering colleges are affiliated to Mahatma Gandhi University, Kerala till 2014-15. From 2015-16 engineering colleges in Kerala state are affiliated to KTU.

 Adi Shankara Institute of Engineering and Technology, Kalady 
 Al Azhar College of Engineering and Technology, Thodupuzha
 Albertian Institute of Science and Technology, Kalamassery
 Amal Jyothi College of Engineering, Kanjirappally
 Baselios Thomas I Catholicose College of Engineering And Technology
 Caarmel Engineering College, Pathanamthitta 
 Christ Knowledge City
 Federal Institute of Science And Technology, Angamaly 
 Government Engineering College, Idukki
 Gurudeva Institute of Science And Technology, Puthuppally, Kottayam
 Holy Kings College of Engineering and Technology, Muvattupuzha
 Ilahia College of Engineering Technology, Mulavoor, Moovattupuzha
 Ilahia School of Science And Technology, Pezhakkapilly, Muvattupuzha
 Indira Gandhi Institute of Engineering and Technology
 Jai Bharath College of Management and Engineering, Perumbavoor 
 KMEA Engineering College, Edathala, Aluva 
 Kottayam Institute of Science and Technology
 Mahatma Gandhi University college of engineering, Thodupuzha 
 Mangalam College of Engineering, Ettumanoor, Kottayam
 Mar Athanasius College of Engineering, Kothamangalam
 Mar Baselios Christian College of Engineering and Technology, Kuttikanam, Idukki 
 Mar Baselios Institute of Technology and Science, Kothamangalam
 Matha College of Technology, Manakappadi, North Paravur
 Musaliar College of Engineering and Technology, Pathanamthitta
 MES College of Engineering, Aluva 
 Rajagiri School of Engineering & Technology, Kakkanad
 Rajiv Gandhi Institute of Technology, Pampady, Kottayam
 Saintgits College of Engineering, Pathamuttom, Kottayam
 SCMS School of Engineering and Technology, Karukutty
 Sree Buddha College of Engineering for Women, Ayathil, Elavumthitta, Pathanamthitta
 Sree Narayana Guru Institute of Science and Technology, North Paravur 
 Sree Narayana Gurukulam College of Engineering, Kadayiruppu, Kolenchery
 Sree Narayana Mangalam Institute of Management & Technology, Maliankara
 St. Joseph’s College of Engineering and Technology, Pala
 Vijnan Institute of Science and Technology, Elanji
 Viswajyothi College of Engineering and Technology, Vazhakulam, Moovattupuzha.
Cochin Institute of science and Technology, Moovattupuzha
 Toms College of Engineering for Startups Mattakara P.O, Kottayam

Art and Sciences

Alphonsa College, Palai
Al-Ameen College, Edathala
Al Azhar collage, thodpuzha
Aquinas College, Edakochi
Bharata Mata College, Thrikkakkara
Bhavans College of Arts and Commerce, Kakkanad
St.Paul's College, Kalamassery
Baselios Poulose Second College
Baselius College, Kottayam
Bishop Abraham Memorial College, Thurithicadu
BCM College Kottayam 
 Bishop Kurialacherry College for Women
BPC College Piravom
 B.V.M holycross college cherpunkal
Catholicate College Pathanamthitta
 Chinmaya College of Arts, Commerce and Science, Tripunithura
Cochin College, Cochin
 College of Applied Science (IHRD), Kattappana
 College of Applied Science (IHRD), Thodupuzha
CMS College, Kottayam
 DC School of Management and Technology, Vagamon
Deva Matha College, Kuravilangad
Dewaswom Board College, Thalayolaparambu
 De Paul Institute of Technology, Angamaly
Ettumanoorappan College, Ettumanoor
Girideepam Institute of Advanced Learning, Kottayam
Government College, Kottayam
Government College, Kattappana
Government College, Manimalakunnu, Koothattukulam
Government College, Tripunithura
Henry Baker College, Melukavu
 Holy Cross College of Management & Technology, Puttady, Idukki
Jawaharlal Nehru Institute of Arts & Science, Balagram, Idukki
 JPM College of Arts & Science, Labbakkada, Idukki
 Kristu Jyoti College of Management & Technology, Changanassery, Kottayam
Kuriakose Elias College, Mannanam
 Kuriakose Gregorios College, Pampady
KMM College of Arts and Science, Thrikkakara
 MES college, Erattupetta
 MES College, Nedumkandam
 Mannam Memorial N.S.S. College, Konni
 Mar Augusthinose College, Ramapuram
Mar Kuriakose College, Puthuvely
Mar Thoma College, Thiruvalla
 Mar Thoma College for Advanced Studies
 Marthoma College of Management and Technology, Perumbavoor
Marian College Kuttikkanam, Idukki
MES College Marampally, Aluva
 MES College, Erumely
 MES College, Edathala
 Mount Carmel College, Karukadom, Kothamangalam
 Musaliar College of Arts and Science, Pathanamthitta
Newman College, Thodupuzha
NSS Hindu College, Changanassery
NSS College Rajakumari
Nirmala College, Muvattupuzha
 Pavanatma College, Murrickacherry
 PGM College, Kangazha
 Parumala Mar Gregorios College, Thiruvalla

Morning Star Home Science College, Angamaly
 PRDS Arts and Science College, Changanassery
RLV College of Music and Fine Arts, Tripunithura
 Rajagiri College of Social Science, Kalamassery
 Rawther Academy of Arts and Science, Vallana, Erumakkad PO, Pathanamthitta Dist., Near Chengannur 
 SAS SNDP YOGAM College, Konni
 Santhigiri college of Computer Sciences, Vazhithala
 Santhigiri Institute of Management, Vazhithala
 SCMS School of Technology and Management, Kalamassery
 SNM College, Maliankara, Moothakunnam
 St. Ephrem Ecumenical Research Institute, Kottayam
 Siena College of Professional Studies, Edacochin
 Sree Vidyadhi Raja N S S College
 St Johns College, Prakkanam
St. Dominic's College, Kanjirapally
Sree Sabareesa College, Mundakayam
 St. Johns Institute of Technology, Pathanamthitta
 St. Mary’s College, Manarcaud, Kottayam
St. Peter's College, Kolenchery
 St. Stephen’s College, Uzhavoor.
St. Thomas College, Palai
 St. Thomas College, Puthencruz
St. Xavier's College for Women, Aluva
St. Xavier's College, Kothavara
 St. Xavier's College, Vaikom
 St. George's College, Aruvithura
St. Thomas College, Kozhencheri
 St. Thomas College, Konni
 St. Kuriakose College of Management and Science, Kuruppampady
 St. Thomas college, Ranni
 Seth Ram Bhadhur Singh Gujarati College, mattancherry
 Swami Saswatheekananda College, Poothotta
Union Christian College, Aluva
 Yeldo Mar Baselios College

Art Education Centre
 The Institute of Fine Arts

Teachers colleges
 University College of Teacher Education, Vaikom
 John Paul Memorial B.Ed. College, Kattappana
 Titus II Teachers College, Thiruvalla
 NSS Training College, Changanacherry

Architecture Colleges

 Asian School of Architecture & Design Innovation, Ernakulam, Kerala

References

 
Mahatma Gandhi University
Mahatma Gandhi University
Mahatma Gandhi University

 Musaliar College of Arts and Science ,Pathanamthitta